Earnest Ambrose Dockstader (died September 17, 1970) was an American football and basketball coach. He served as the head football coach, and head basketball coach, and athletic director at the Agricultural College of the State of Montana—now known as Montana State University—during the 1911–12 and 1912–13 academic years. During this time he was also a post-graduate student in the school's mathematics department.

Head coaching record

Football

References

Year of birth missing
1970 deaths
Basketball coaches from Montana
Montana State Bobcats athletic directors
Montana State Bobcats football coaches
Montana State Bobcats men's basketball coaches
Montana State University alumni
Sportspeople from Bozeman, Montana